Foundation Coal Holdings, Inc. was a large American coal mining company.  Until its July 31, 2009 merger with Alpha Natural Resources to form the third largest American coal company, the company was publicly traded on the New York Stock Exchange under the symbol FCL.  With corporate offices in Linthicum Heights, Maryland, the former Foundation Coal operates coal mines in Pennsylvania, West Virginia and Wyoming, and was, prior to its merger with Alpha Natural Resources, the fourth-largest American coal producer by tonnage.

Foundation Coal, through subsidiaries, owns and operates several of the largest coal mines in the United States, including:
Belle Ayr Mine, Wyoming: 26.6 million short tons produced in 2007, ranked 7th
Eagle Butte Mine, Wyoming: 25.0 million short tons produced in 2007, ranked 9th
Cumberland Mine, Pennsylvania: 7.3 million short tons produced in 2007, ranked 21st
Emerald Mine No 1, Pennsylvania: 6.7 million short tons produced in 2007, ranked 34th

References

Coal companies of the United States
Companies based in Anne Arundel County, Maryland